Gjernes is a contemporary style of fine art; sculptural and decorative. It is a spreading popular style of art, especially in Scandinavia, because the Norwegian Government's wedding gift to Princess Märtha Louise of Norway and her husband Ari Behn was two pieces of furniture work by Liv Mildrid Gjernes.

A vast number of sculptural decoration assignments, for private and public institutions, have been accomplished in this style.

Furniture
Norwegian art